Kaiku is a Bantu language of the Democratic Republic of the Congo.

References

Biran languages